Wydad Athletic Club, commonly referred to as Wydad AC and known as Wydad, Wydad Casablanca, or simply as WAC, is a Moroccan professional sports club based in Casablanca. Wydad AC is best known for its professional football team that competes in Botola, the top tier of the Moroccan football league system, they are one of three clubs to have never been relegated from the top flight.

Founded on 8 May 1937 by seven Moroccans belonging the national movement for independence, led by Mohamed Benjelloun Touimi. They initially focused on water polo to give indigenous Moroccans the right to access swimming pools before Mohamed Ben Lahcen Affani – also known by the nickname of "Père Jégo" ("Father Jégo") – created the football section in 1939, he was the first manager of the team. The club has traditionally worn a red home kit since inception.

Domestically, Wydad has won a record of 22 Moroccan league titles and 9 Moroccan Throne Cups, becoming the most titled club in Morocco. In continental and international competitions, the club has won three CAF Champions Leagues, one African Cup Winners' Cup, one CAF Super Cup, one Afro-Asian Club Championship, one Mohammed V Trophy, one Arab Club Champions Cup, one Arab Super Cup, three North African Championship Cup and one North African Cup.

The Reds shares rivalry with Raja CA, named the Casablanca derby. Wydad also holds rivalry with AS FAR.

The club also competes in basketball, handball, field hockey, cycle sport, volleyball, and rugby.

History

Before independence (1935–1955)

Creation and early Wydad (1937–1940)

The origin of the establishment of Wydad Athletic Club on resistance the colonialism that was imposed by the French authorities during the era of protectorate in Morocco, since before the independence of Morocco, the port of Casablanca was surrounded by a large number of swimming pools that were dedicated to clubs and sports associations only, and the Europeans were the ones who can supervising them. In beginning of the year 1935, many Moroccan Muslims and Jews joined several clubs to take advantage of the private swimming pools, but they were soon expelled by the colonizer because of their fear of an increase in their numbers later, and from here came the idea of establishing a Moroccan club by Moroccans only, so that the club can benefit of the swimming pools and participate in water polo competitions.

The idea of establishing Wydad Athletic Club was not as easy as it could be imagined, as all the members of the original core, including Hajj Mohamed Benjelloun Touimi and Hajj Dr. Abdellatif Benjelloun Touimi, suffered from the continued rejection and intransigence of the French authorities to the idea of establishing a “full Moroccan club”, which prompted them to resort to the Franco-Moroccan Association, in order to amend the matters related to registering the club's name, after which the General Resident in Morocco at the time, Maurice Nogues, personally intervened to allow the establishment of Wydad Athletic Club, but with specific conditions.

Wydad is an Arabic word that means "love", "sincere affection.", during the frequent meetings which led to the creation of the club, one of the founding members arrived late after watching the latest film of the legendary Egyptian actress and singer Umm Kulthum with the same name, though latinized as Weddad, as it coincided with this answer that Zaghrouda set out from one of the neighboring houses to the meeting place, the attendees were optimistic about it, and Hajj Mohamed Ben Lahcen Affani expressed his support for choosing this name, but the intervention of some of the attendees led to a postponement for the final decision on the name of the club, except after the presence of a large number of managers and players, as the name was approved after holding a general gathering, the result was the suggestion and choice of the name "Wydad Athletic Club", as a name for the club without the inclusion of the word “Casablanca” because the club represents all Moroccans, not just the residents of the city of Casablanca.

Wydad played its first game against defending champion USM Casablanca as part of the first day of the championship in what is a criterion of war in September 1939. This meeting was the first of Wydad ended in defeat with a score of two goals to one. The first scorer was Abdelkader Lakhmiri. During this first season Wydad it was not a championship that was played but a true test of war called cutting war because of the Second World War. The first edition of this competition was played so in the context of the 1939–40 season and ended with a victory for the USM Casablanca facing the new team what Wydad. One who had played his first match against USM and had also faced rematch is still faced in the final after an incredible journey that has to qualify. The meeting was ended with a score of 1–0 at Stade Philippe to Casablanca. 1939–40: Champion of Chaouia League 1940: Winner of Moroccan Super Cup 1940: Runner-up of Moroccan Cup

The following season was also a criterion of war except that this time Wydad fails the same course as in the previous season. The Reds began the competition in a group comprising a total of nine groups or they managed to skilled in the finals. The final phase started from the quarter-finals where finally, the WAC is beaten by the Olympic Khouribga to score a 1–0. And finally. 1940–41: Runner-up of Chaouia League.

Promotion and Honour Division (1941–1947) 

After playing two seasons in cutting the war, the French authorities under the orders of the Vichy regime decided to play the championship again at war. Despite the very good performance of Wydad, the French authorities decided to Wydad play in the second division and not first. One of the main reasons is the fact that the federation at the time was managed by teams of 1st Division. Despite these injustices, Wydad managed to be the first in their pool and in the context of a game between the dam at Ittihad Ribati, he succeeds in beating up the latter by a goal to nil. For fear that Wydad up in the first division, the federation decided to play another game the opponent this time in the Athletic Union of Meknes. This encounter was played behind closed doors in Meknes and during the month of Ramadan. The team was composed meknassis majority of non-Muslims opposed to Wydad. But finally Wydad thanks to a goal from Ben Messaoud to 12 minute first successful rising after receiving a letter from the federation confirming the rise in 1st division.
1941–42: Champion of Moroccan Championship D2
1941–42: Runner-up of Chaouia League.

The next season after winning the championship promotion honor is the 2nd level football league in Morocco and after winning his matches dams, Wydad newly promoted division plays of honor is 'equivalent of first division football league in Morocco. During this season, Wydad had a good run, finishing in the top three of their group to play the final round, which begins from the second round. And after a very good run, Wydad reached the final of the chicken and confronts the USM Casablanca club already encountered in regional chickens. Wydad fails to win his first title in this competition and was beaten on the score of 2–0.
1942–43: Champion of Chaouia League.
1942–43: Runner-up of Moroccan Championship.

During the season 1943–44, the red and white ends the year with a balance of the quarter-finals after several victories, the club face Fedala score on the river 2–0. Also noteworthy during this season package of USM Casablanca. In 1944–45, the club managed the final qualification in the pool but was eliminated by the Association Sportive Marrakech Marrakech often called SAM despite a victory in the second round against the ASM score of 3–0.

The 1945–46 season is one of the best in the club since its inception as Wydad won the regional championship with a total of more than 62 points or 19 wins, 2 losses and 1 draw. After winning the title, Wydad qualifies for final round where he was defeated by the USM Casablanca final score of 3–1. Despite this defeat, the balance of the season is rather positive. During the 1946–47 season, the club honors its first participation in the North African Cup but failed to move beyond sixteenth-finals following a defeat club Fedala the most minimal scores a 1–0. In the league, the WAC failed to win the title.

Early titles and independence (1947–1956)

It will take more than nine years for Wydad to finally win its first championship. In a group of eight clubs, Wydad played fourteen matches, won six, lost two and drawn six. Moroccan Iyad El Baz helped win Wydad's first ever trophy. During the same season Wydad participates in the North African Championship with the title won and even managed to win by beating the US Athletic score of 4–2. Wydad also took part in the 1948–49 season of the North African Championship, which is a competition organized by the Union of North African Football that it is made up of five leagues is that of the Morocco, Tunisia, Algiers, Oran and Constantine. The competition began for Wydad in the knockout final against Red Star of Algiers. The match ended in a victory for Wydad AC score of 3–1. Then, in the quarter-finals, he must face the USM Bone or he managed to climb in the semi-finals with a victory on the score of 2–1. Continuing his journey, he must then face the Olympic Hussein Dey, club league Algiers. This meeting was a massacre ending with a victory on the score of 3–0 while the club qualified for the finals is a club and even Casablanca Moroccan who managed to beat the Sports Club Hammam Lif on the modest score of 1–0. this club is in fact the US Athletic. The final was held in Casablanca in 1949, is opposed both clubs are Wydad AC that and the US Athletic and after 90 minutes of play, Wydad won the competition for the first time in its history with a victory on the score of 2–1. During the same season they also managed to win a Championship North African football when editing played as mini-league since it was the team with the most points wins the championship, they also won another championship, so it is the first club which has tripled something which nobody has done throughout history. During the following season Wydad fails to succeed on a hat-trick but doubled. It won the Moroccan championship for the third time in its history and a row with a total of more than 57 points, and won the championship of North African football by beating the Athletic Union Muslim Oran on the score 4–0 in Algiers on 28 May 1950.

During the 1950–51 season, Wydad continues its momentum by winning the national championship but was beaten in the final of the African Cup North face SC Bel-Abbes on the score 1–0. During the last season played before independence, Wydad won his fifth and last championship title before Moroccan independence. Participating teams in this championship was twelve in number counting Wydad. During the same season, the Reds were beaten in the final of the championship of North Africa to Casablanca in the face of Esperance Sportive de Guelma score of 2–1.

After independence (1956–1960)
Morocco becomes independent, and the WAC receives the honorary Resistance Card with the number 1 by his royal majesty Mohammed V. Before launching the first Moroccan championship for the 1956/57 season, the committee decides to organize a first competition called Independence Cup, and classify the teams in the divisions. This cup is won by Wydad AC which has become the number 1 club in Morocco. The 38th edition of the championship (the first after independence) is won by the WAC (title holder) with the Kawkab of Marrakech as its runner-up. The same season in the cup, Wydad qualified for the final against the Mouloudia Club of Oujda. The match ends with a score of 1–1, King Mohammed V, Crown Prince Hassan II and WAC founder Mohamed Benjelloun Touimi who are present in this final, decide to give the cup to Mouloudia Oujda. because he scored the first goal.

During the following season, the WAC finished vice-champion of Morocco with 69 points, one less than the champion, the Kawkab of Marrakech. The Wydad who was first loses all his points won against the USM Casablanca following the general forfeit of it and also loses in the final of the Morocco Cup against the same opponent of last season on the score of 2 goals to 1.

During the following season, Wydad is still vice-champion behind the Casablanca star while in the Throne Cup, the WAC is eliminated in the round of 16 against the FAR of Rabat, winners of this competition. WAC forward Mustapha Khalfi finished top scorer in Botola with 21 goals.

The following season, Wydad reached fourth place with only one point less than the top three. In the Cup, and after defeating Essaouira with a score of one goal to zero, the WAC was eliminated in the quarterfinals against Mouloudia d'Ouejda.

The 1960s
The first 1960/61 season ended badly with a 7th place in the league, in the cup the WAC was able to climb into the final by defeating the future champion of this season, the FAR of Rabat, on the score of two goals to one. But Wydad has always missed its finals since 1956 and faces last season's champion Kenitra Athletic Club. The Wydad was beaten with the score of a goal to zero on April 24, 1960, at the Stade d'honneur in Casablanca. The following season, the WAC finished 6th in the Botola classification, and was beaten in the eighth finals of the Morocco Cup against Mouloudia d'Ouejda with the score of 2 goals to 0. In the 1962 season / 63, the WAC again finished 6th in Botola, and reached the semi-final of the Morocco Cup eliminated by KAC Marrakech. The following season, WAC was again 6th in Botola, and was a finalist in the Morocco Cup against KAC Marrakech. In the 1964/65 season, the WAC finished in the championship in 5th place, and was eliminated in the quarter-finals of the Cup.

It was not until the 1965/66 season to see the WAC champion of Morocco for the 7th time, with a total of 57 points. As the team was eliminated in the eighth finals of the Morocco Cup against MAS Fez, it took fifteen years to return to the Moroccan Super Cup against COD Meknès (winner of the Cup). The WAC participated for the first time in its history in the Mohammed V Cup where it finished 4th, after elimination against Real Madrid in the semi-final with the score of 2 goals to 0.

The 1966–67 season ended with a 4th place in the championship, and an elimination in the quarter-final of the Morocco Cup against the sports association of the royal armed forces. The following season the WAC will finish 8th in Botola, and eliminated in the round of 16 of the Cup against the same opponent, the sports association of the royal armed forces.

During the 1968–69 season, the WAC returned to the Botola podium, winning its 8th title of Champion of Morocco with a total of 73 points, including 16 victories, 11 draws and 3 lost matches. But unfortunately, he was eliminated in the second round of the Cup. In June, facing RS Settat (winner of the Morocco Cup), the WAC won its 6th Moroccan Super Cup solved by captain Mohammed Sahraoui.

Finally the Morocco Cup (1970–1979)

We had to wait thirty-one years to see the WAC winner of the Morocco Cup, and it was against RS Settat that the reds won the title with the score of a goal to zero. Compared to the 1960s, the emperor of Moroccan football won three times the Botola and three times the Cup as well as the Mohammed V Cup thanks to legendary players such as Larbi Aherdane, Ezzaki Badou, Aziz Bouderbala, Petchou or Abdelmajid Shaita. In the 1969–70 season, Wydad finished 5th at Botola, winner of the Cup. 
1970–71: 7th at Botola, 2nd round of the Cup. 
1971–72: vice-champion of Botola, 1/8 final of the Cup. 
1972–73: 9th at Botola, 2nd round of the Cup. 
1973–74: 5th in Botola, 1/4 final of the cup. 
1974–75: 9th at Botola, 2nd round of the Cup, winner of the Green Market Cup. 
1975–76: Moroccan champion, 9th coronation, 1/8 Cup final. 
1976–77: Champion of Morocco, 10th coronation, 1/8 final of the Cup, 3rd of the Mohammed V Cup. 
1977–78: Champion of Morocco, 11th coronation, winner of the 2nd coronation Cup. 
1978–79: 3rd at Botola, Cup winner, 3rd coronation, Mohammed V Cup winner.

The revival (1980–1989)
In the first season, the WAC finished runner-up in Morocco with only 1 point difference from the winner, and won the Cup for the second time in its history, and regained the Botola podium for the 12th time in 1986, and participates for the first time in the CAF Champions League, since it is the first Moroccan club to win the Arab Cup of Champions Clubs in 1989 and a 3rd Cup of Morocco in the same year. In the 1979–80: vice-champion of Morocco, 1/8 Cup final, winner of the Meknes International Tournament. 1980–81: 4th at Botola, Winner of the 2nd coronation Cup, winner of the Mohamed Benjelloun Trophy. 1981–82: vice-champion of Morocco, 1/8 final of the Cup.1982–83: 3rd at Botola, 1/8 Cup final, winner of the Independence Tournament. 1983–84: 5th at Botola, 2nd round of the Cup. 1984–85: 4th at Botola, 1/8 Cup final. 1985–86: Moroccan champion 12th coronation, 2nd round of the Cup. 1986–87: 4th at Botola, 2nd round of the Cup, 2nd round of the Champions League. 1987–88: 4th at Botola, semi-finalist of the Cup, winner of the Pescara International Cup. 1988–89: 5th at Botola, winner of the 3rd coronation Cup, winner of the Arab Cup of Champions Clubs.

Golden Era (1990–1999)
During this decade, the WAC won all possible competitions, with two consecutive victories in Botola, the CAF Champions League, the Arab Super Cup, the 15th coronation of champion of Morocco, the Afro-Asian Super Cup, the 8th Cup of Morocco in its history, twice the Moroccan Supercup in 1995 and 1999: 1989–90: Moroccan champion, 13th coronation, 2nd round of the Cup. 1990–91: Moroccan champion, 14th coronation, 1/4 final of the Cup, semi-finalist of the CAF Champions League. 1991–92: 3rd at Botola, 1/8 final of the Cup, winner of the CAF Champions League, winner of the Arab Super Cup. 1992–93: finalist of the CAF Supercup, champion of Morocco, 15th coronation, 1/4 Cup final, winner of the Afro-Asian Cup. 1993–94: vice-champion of Morocco, winner of the Cup, 6th coronation, finalist of the African-European Cup, 2nd round of the Champions League. 1994–95: winner of the Moroccan Supercup, 7th coronation, 5th at Botola, 1/8 Cup final. 1995–96: 3rd at Botola, 1/4 Cup final, winner of the Dallas International Cup. 1996–97: vice-champion of Morocco, winner of the Cup, 7th coronation. 1997–98: 3rd at Botola, Cup winner, 8th coronation, Supercup finalist, semi-finalist of the CAF Cup Cup. 1998–99: winner of the Moroccan Supercup, 8th coronation, 5th at Botola, 1/16 Cup final, CAF Cup finalist.

Decline (2000–2014)

During this decade, the Red Devils have won fewer titles than before. It was a bad chapter in the history of the club: 1999–00: vice-champion of Morocco, 1/16 Cup final, 1/8 CAF Cup final. 2000–01: 7th at Botola, winner of the 9th coronation Cup, 1/4 final CAF Cup. 2001–02: vice-champion of Morocco, 1/16 final of the Cup, winner of the CAF Cup Cup after defeating Asante Kotoko S.C. 2002–03: 3rd at Botola, Cup finalist, semi-finalist of the CAF Cup Cup. 2003–04: 3rd at Botola, Cup finalist after a 3–1 loss to Zamalek SC, intermediate round Confederation Cup. 2004–05: 3rd at Botola, 1/16 Cup final, 1/4 final of the Arab Cup. 2005–06: Moroccan champion 16th coronation, 1/8 final of the Cup, 1/4 final of the Arab Cup. 2006–07: 4th at Botola, semi-finalist of the Cup, 2nd round of the CAF Champions League. 2007–08: 7th at Botola, 1/8 Cup final, Arab Cup finalist after a 2–0 loss to ES Sétif. 2008–09: 4th at Botola, 1/4 Cup final, Arab Cup finalist after a 2–1 loss to Espérance Sportive de Tunis. : 2009–10: Moroccan champion 17th coronation, 1/16 final of the Cup.

Said Naciri era (2014–present)

First Champions League in 25 years (2017) 

From the start of the second decade of the 20th century, the WAC returned to the Botola podium by winning its 17th title, then in 2015, 2017 and 2019, as well as the CAF Champions League in 2017, and the Super Cup of CAF in 2018. 2014–15: Moroccan champion 18th coronation, 1/8 Cup final. 2016–17: Moroccan champion 19th coronation, 1/8 final of the Cup, winner of the CAF Champions League. 2017–18: vice-champion of Morocco, semi-finalist of the Cup, 1/4 final of the CAF Champions League, 1/8 final of the Arab Cup, winner of the 2018 CAF Super Cup.

Second star and Radès final (2019) 
2018–19: Moroccan champion 20th coronation, finalist of the CAF Champions League 2018–19 after a devastating Var problem that gifted Espérance Sportive de Tunis the win.  2019–20: vice-champion of Morocco, semi-finalist of the CAF Champions League 2019–20. On 14 July 2021, Wydad defeated Mouloudia Oujda 0–2 at the Honneur Stadium to clinch their 21st league title, with three games left in the season, semi-finalist of the CAF Champions League 2019–20.

Third Champions League title (2022–present) 
One day after the club's 85th anniversary, Wydad defeated Atlético Petróleos de Luanda 4–2 on aggregate (3–1 away and 1–1 at home) to advance to their 5th Champions League final and the 3rd one in 6 years. On 30 May 2022, in a rematch of 2017 final, Wydad AC beat defending champions Al Ahly in the final to be crowned champions of Africa for the third time in its history, thanks to a brace from the Man of the Match, Zouhair El Moutaraji. During this campaign under Walid Regrgui role, the Red Castle has achieved many national records in the CAF Champions League: First Moroccan team to win an away semi-final match, most wins for a Moroccan team in a single season (9 wins), most goals scored in a single season (28 goals), and first Moroccan team to go undefeated for 9 straight games in a single season. With this win, Wydad will play in the first-ever all-Moroccan CAF Super Cup against 2021–22 CAF Confederation Cup winners, RS Berkane. On 21 July 2022, Wydad was elected as the best Club of the year in the 2022 CAF Awards.

Crest

Home stadium 

Stade Mohammed V is the home stadium of both Wydad and Raja. It was called the Stade Marcel Cerdan from 1955 to 1956 and the Stade d'Honneur from 1956 to 1981. It was inaugurated on 6 March 1955 and renovated three times in 1981, 2000 and 2007. It is part of a large sports complex in the heart of Casablanca, specifically in the up-scale neighbourhood of Maârif.

It has a capacity of 67,000 spectators (reduced to more than 80,000 in 2000), not counting the North and South stands that have no seats. In 1997, 110,000 spectators showed up to the stadium in a match of the Moroccan national team against Ghana. In 2007, the stadium was equipped with a semi-artificial turf which meets international standards.

Supporters
The Wydad is the most popular team in Morocco, with a fan base counted in millions all around the world. Wydad's ultras group is called "Ultras Winners", commonly referred to as "Ultras Winners 2005" in reference to the year of creation. With "Together forever" as their slogan, they are renowned all over the world for their unconditional love and support for the team, as well as their spectacular displays at each game. With members all around the world, the Ultras Winners has a network of branches, called sections, in every continent with cells in each country, allowing the members to remain connected and engaged. All around Morocco, and wherever the team plays internationally, one can find tags with the mentions "UW05", "Win's 05" or "Winners05" as well as stickers from the group.

In 2015, Wydad Casablanca ranked the beat “Tifo” in the world by french magazine La Grinta.

The "Winners 2005" was voted "World's best ultras" three times, in 2015, 2019, and 2022 by Ultras World magazine.

Statistics and records

Notable players
This list includes players that have appeared in at least 100 league games and/or have reached international status.

Statistics in Botola
• Largest home win: WAC 7–0 HUSA (1958–59

• Largest away win: RSK 0–6 WAC (1985–86)

• Record number of games won in one season: 23 games in (1985–86)

• Record goals scored in a season: 58 goals (1985–86)

• Record for lowest number of goals conceded: 8 games (2002–03)

• Record of consecutive games won: 9 in (1990–91)

• Record number of most away wins in one season: 14 games (1985–86)

• Record for lowest number of draws: 5 games (1986–87)

• Record goals scored in one season: 56 goals in 30 games in (2018–19) 1.86 goals scored per game

Sports records
• Record for the highest number of titles in the Moroccan Championship: 22

• Record for the highest number of vice-champion titles in the Moroccan Championship: 14

• Record for most titles in Morocco: 50

• Record for most national titles: 37

• Record for the highest number of consecutive seasons in the Moroccan league: 77

• Only to have never left the championship since 1942

• Most wins record: 1,392

• Record for most goals scored: 2293

• Record for the fewest defeats in the league: 1 (1977–78)

• 2nd highest number of Throne Cup: 9 titles

• Record number of finals in the Throne Cup with 15 editions including 6 lost

Individual sports records
• Largest number of top scorers in the Championship, 14 times with 10 scorers: Chtouki in 1948 and 1955, Abdesslam in 1949, Driss in 1950, Khalfi in 1951 and 1959, Chrif in 1978, Mjidou in 1984, Nader in 1986, 1987 and 1989, Fertout in 1993, Evona in 2015, Jebor in 2017 and Kaabi in 2021.

• Aziz Bouderbala has won the Throne Cup 4 times with Wydad which is a national record

• Moussa Ndao is the first foreigner to score in a 1989 Throne Cup final

• Abdelkhalek the only player to score 3 goals in a 1978 final
Abdelkhalek is the player who scored the most goals in the Throne Cup final

• Nader has finished three times top scorer in the Moroccan championship, he is the recordman with Laghrissi and Anaflous of the FAR, as well as Boussati of the KAC

• Badou Zaki is the only goalkeeper who won the African Ballon d'Or (in 1986).

Nationalistic connotation of the club
Wydad has embodied the struggle of Moroccan people against the French occupation, so much so that in all the soccer fields of Morocco where Wydad played was encouraged by thousands of fans. Unlike other clubs like the Racing Casablanca or the Union Sportive Marocaine (USM), the Wydad was composed mostly of Moroccan footballers (10 Moroccan players out of 11 was the maximum allowed by the regulations) and in some way was considered by the supporters Moroccans, a Moroccan national: through sport and Wydad, the Moroccans could symbolically defeat the occupier. This quality was specific to Wydad and no other Moroccan club can boast this status before independence. The Wydad was the "standard-bearer" of Morocco wherever he played. In a North African Cup game in Algeria, the Moroccan Wydad players refused to play the race because the Moroccan flag was not hoisted next to the French one: the game did not start until the organizers decided to raise the flag of Morocco next to the French tricolor. An anecdote that shows how the sense of the homeland was an important value for Wydad players goes back to those years: a player of Wydad, Abdeslam, during the pre-game match urinated in the direction of the musicians who played the Marseillaise.

The great victories of the Wydad in front of the teams owned by the French protectorate like the USM were experienced as a national holiday by all Moroccans. No coincidence that the crown prince to the throne of the Kingdom of Morocco, Hassan II was the main supporter of the team and did not hesitate, during the end of the first times of the games, to go down in the locker room to encourage the players of Wydad, who were considered by him and called "Moroccan troops".

Honours

Performance in CAF competitions

CAF Champions League: 14 appearances
1987 – Second Round
1991 – Quarter-finals
1992 – Champion
1993 – Second Round
1994 – Second Round
2007 – Second Round
2011 – Runner-up
2016 – Semi-finals
2017 – Champion
2018 – Quarter final
2018–19 – Runner-up
2019–20 – Semi-finals
2020–21 – Semi-finals
2021–22 – Champion

CAF Confederation Cup: 4 appearances

2004 – Second Round of 16
2007 – Second Round of 16
2012 – Group stage
2013 – Second round

CAF Super Cup 4 appearences

1993 – Runner-up
2003 – Runner-up
2018 – Champion

2022 – Runner-up

African Cup Winners' Cup: 3 appearances
1998 – Semi-finals
2002 – Champion
2003 – Semi-finals

CAF Cup: 3 appearances
1999 – Runner-up
2000 – Second Round
2001 – Quarter-finals

Players

Current squad

Out on loan

Personnel

Current technical staff

Management

Managers

 Père Jégo (1939–52)
 Mohamed Massoun (1952–60, 1962–66, 1968–69)
 Mustapha Bettache (1972–74, 1975–78)
 Lucien Leduc (1974–75)
 Jorvan Vieira (1984)
 Jean Vincent (1985–86)
 Cor van der Hart (1988–89)
 Abdellah Settati
 Yuriy Sevastyanenko (1989–94)
 Zaki Badou (1995–96)
 Marcel Husson (1996–97)
 Alexandru Moldovan (1997–98)
 Zaki Badou (1998–2000)
 Yuriy Sevastyanenko (1997, 1999, 2000–01)
 Ladislas Lozano (1 January 2002 – 20 March 2002)
 Oscar Fulloné (2002–03)
 Rachid Taoussi (2003)
 Žarko Olarević (2003)
 Ivica Todorov (1 July 2003 – 30 November 2003)
 Michel Decastel (1 December 2003 – 30 June 2004)
 Jacky Bonnevay (1 July 2004 – 30 June 2005)
 José Romão (2005–06)
 Ladislas Lozano (15 February 2007 – 30 April 2007)
 Nelo Vingada (2007)

 Plamen Markov (1 July 2007 – 2007)
 Jean-Michel Cavalli (12 December 2007 – 10 February 2008)
 Oscar Fulloné (March 2008 – 8 June 2008)
 Zaki Badou (26 June 2008 – 23 April 2010)
 Fakhreddine Rajhi (May 2010)
 Dutra (2010)
 Diego Garzitto (Oct 2010 – Jan 11)
 Fakhreddine Rajhi (2011)
 Michel Decastel (20 June 2011 – 5 January 2012)
 Benito Floro (1 January 2012 – 20 September 2012)
 Zaki Badou (7 October 2012 – 2 June 2013)
 Abderrahim Talib (18 June 2013 – 24 December 2013)
 John Toshack (June 2014 – September 2016)
 Sébastien Desabre (September 2016 – January 2017)
 Hussein Ammouta (January 2017 – January 2018)
 Faouzi Benzarti (January 2018 – July 2019)
 Zoran Manojlovic (July 2019 – January 2020)
 Sébastien Desabre (January 2020 – February 2020)
 Juan Carlos Garrido (February 2020 – September 2020)
 Miguel Ángel Gamondi (September 2020 – November 2020)
 Faouzi Benzarti (November 2020 - 31 August 2021)
 Walid Regragui (10 August 2021 – 28 July 2022)
 Hussein Ammouta (18 August 2022 – 30 November 2022)
 Mehdi Nafti (2 January 2023 - 26 February 2023)
 Juan Carlos Garrido (26 February 2023 - present)

Presidents

 Mohamed Benjelloun (1937–42)
 Abdelkader Benjelloun (1942–44)
 Abdellatif Alami (1944–45)
 Mohamed Belahssan Benjelloun (1945–48)
 Abderrahmane Slaoui (1948–49)
 Abderrahmane El-Khatib (1949–56)
 Azzedine Benjelloun (1956–62)
 Nacer Laraki (1962–63)
 Hassan El-Joundi (1963–65)
 Ahmed Lahrizi (1965–71)

 Abderrazak Lahlou (1971–72)
 Abderrazak Mekouar (1972–93)
 Boubker Jdahim (1993–97)
 Abdelmalik Sentissi (1997–99)
 Nasserdine Doublali (1999–03)
 Abdelilah El-Manjra (2003–05)
 Taïb El-Fechtali (2005–07)
 Abdelillah El-Akram (2007–2014)
 Saïd Naciri (2014–)

Notes

References

External links

 Official club website
 News website
 Wydad website
 Ultras website
 Wydad AC organize a virtual match vs Coronavirus

 
Football clubs in Morocco
CAF Champions League winning clubs
African Cup Winners Cup winning clubs
CAF Super Cup winning clubs
Football clubs in Casablanca
Association football clubs established in 1937
Multi-sport clubs in Morocco
1937 establishments in Morocco
Sports clubs in Morocco
Basketball teams in Morocco